Yŏmju County is a kun, or county, in northwestern North P'yŏngan province, North Korea, on the coast of the Yellow Sea.  It is bordered by Ryongch'ŏn and P'ihyŏn to the north, Tongrim to the east, and Ch'ŏlsan to the south; to the west lies the ocean. The county was created in 1952 from portions of Ch'ŏlsan and Ryongch'ŏn.

Geography
The terrain of Yŏmju is mostly level or rolling, sloping upward from the southwest to the northeast. In the north and east are small mountains like Mangilsan (613 m).  The islands of the Pansŏng archipelago lie offshore and are a noted regional attraction. Other islands include Taedasado and Changdo.

Administrative divisions
Yŏmju county is divided into 1 ŭp (town), 1 rodongjagu (workers' district) and 22 ri (villages):

Climate
Although warmed somewhat by the sea, the local climate remains basically continental, with an average annual temperature of 8.4 °C reflecting the fluctuation between January's -8.7 °C and August's 24 °C.  Annual rainfall is relatively low, 800–1000 mm.

Economy
Due to the level terrain, 54.4% of the land in Yŏmju is cultivated, with only 15% remaining as forestland (mostly pine).  The county is North P'yŏngan's second-largest producer of rice; other local crops include soybeans, maize, tobacco, and fruit. Fishing and livestock raising are also important local industries, as is salt harvesting. Yŏmju produces enough salt to satisfy 10% of national demand.  A large aquaculture installation also operates in the county, dating from the early 1980s; it is reported to cover more than 1 km², with more than 80 separate ponds.

Transportation
Yŏmju county is served by the P'yŏngŭi, Tasado and Paengma lines of the Korean State Railway.

Places of interest
A large rock in Namap-ri has been designated North Korean natural monument No. 64.

Notes

References

See also
Geography of North Korea
Administrative divisions of North Korea
North Pyongan

External links

Counties of North Pyongan